The tellurite ion is . A tellurite (compound), for example sodium tellurite, is a compound that contains this ion.  They are typically colorless or white salts, which in some ways are comparable to sulfite.  A mineral with the formula TeO2 is called tellurite.

Structure and reactions

Tellurite dianion is pyramidal, like selenite and sulfite.  The anion has C3v symmetry.

Tellurites can be reduced to elemental tellurium by electrolysis or a strong reducing agent.  When fused with nitrate salts, tellurite salts oxidize to tellurates.

Upon acidification of aqueous solutions of tellurite salts, solid hydrated tellurium dioxide (TeO2) precipitates.  This reaction allows the separation of tellurium from selenium since selenous acid remains soluble at low pH.  The intermediate in the protonation occurs at oxygen to give [TeO2(OH)]−.

Uses
Potassium tellurite (K2TeO3) is used together with agar as part of a selective medium for growth of some bacteria (Clauberg medium). Corynebacteria and some other species reduce  to elemental Te, which stains the bacteria black.

See also
List of tellurites

References

Further reading
M. R. Masson, H. D. Lutz and B. Engelen (eds.) "Sulfites, Selenites and Tellurites", Pergamon Press, Oxford, 1986.

Oxyanions
Microbiological media ingredients
Tellurites